Deidt was a racing car constructor. Deidt cars competed in the FIA World Championship (Indy 500 only) from 1950 to 1952.

World Championship Indy 500 results

Formula One constructors (Indianapolis only)
American racecar constructors